Chattanooga Express were a soccer club that competed in the USISL
from 1992 to 1997. The club originally started in 1992 as the Chattanooga Railroaders in the USISL. They became the Chattanooga Express in 1993. The club played in both the indoor and outdoor USISL leagues through 1996. They moved to the USISL Pro League in 1995 and were later relegated to the USISL PDSL in 1997.

Year-by-year

References

USISL teams
Sports in Chattanooga, Tennessee
Defunct soccer clubs in Tennessee
Defunct indoor soccer clubs in the United States
Soccer clubs in Tennessee
Association football clubs established in 1992
Association football clubs disestablished in 1997
1992 establishments in Tennessee
1997 disestablishments in Tennessee